Vexillum voncoseli is a species of sea snail, a marine gastropod mollusk, in the family Costellariidae, the ribbed miters.

Distribution
This marine species occurs off the Philippines at depths between 50 m and 150 m

References

External links
 Conchology Inc : Pusia voncoseli; accessed : 27 January 2011

voncoseli